Juscelino Kubitschek ("Juscelino Kubitschek - Brazilian president") is a bairro in the District of Sede in the municipality of Santa Maria, in the Brazilian state of Rio Grande do Sul. It is located in west Santa Maria.

Villages 
The bairro contains the following villages: Conjunto Habitacional Santa Marta, Juscelino Kubitschek, Vila Caramelo, Vila Jóquei Clube, Vila Martelet, Vila Prado, Vila Rigão.

Gallery of photos

References 

Bairros of Santa Maria, Rio Grande do Sul